David Rounds (October 9, 1930, Bronxville, New York – December 9, 1983, Lomontville, Ulster County, New York) was an American actor of stage and screen. He received both a Tony Award and a Drama Desk Award in 1980 for his role in Morning's at Seven. He served as a lieutenant in the United States Navy during the Korean War.

Rounds played several reoccurring television roles, including appearing in two episodes of the sitcom Alice. He played Christopher Spencer in the miniseries The Blue and The Grey. His last New York appearance was in the one-man show Herringbone at Playwrights Horizons a year before his death from cancer at age 53.

References

External links

1930 births
1983 deaths
American male stage actors
American male television actors
Deaths from cancer in New York (state)
Male actors from New York (state)
Denison University alumni
Drama Desk Award winners
People from Bronxville, New York
Tony Award winners
20th-century American male actors